is a football stadium in Morioka, Iwate Prefecture, Japan. It was formerly known as Morioka Minami Park Stadium. Since April 2016 it has been called Iwagin Stadium for the naming rights by Bank of Iwate.

It is the home stadium of football club Iwate Grulla Morioka.

Gallery

External links

1998 establishments in Japan
Sports venues completed in 1998
Sport in Morioka
Iwate Grulla Morioka
Sports venues in Iwate Prefecture
Football venues in Japan

施設
バックスタンド・・・芝生席
両ゴール裏・・・立ち見
メインスタンド・・・ベンチシート